Marzia Peretti (born 19 June 1965) is an Italian speed skater. She competed at the 1980 Winter Olympics and the 1984 Winter Olympics.

References

1965 births
Living people
Italian female speed skaters
Olympic speed skaters of Italy
Speed skaters at the 1980 Winter Olympics
Speed skaters at the 1984 Winter Olympics
Sportspeople from Turin